Elysia Crampton Presents: Demon City is the second studio album by American electronic musician Elysia Crampton. It consists of a series of collaborations with fellow underground and queer electronic artists, and it has been described as an "epic poem" by Crampton. It was released on July 22, 2016, on Break World Records.

Accolades

Track listing

References 

2016 albums
Elysia Crampton albums